Ramreddy Damodar Reddy (born 14 September 1952) is an Indian Politician, representing the Indian National Congress party. R. Damodar Reddy won his seat in the 2009 Andhra Pradesh state assembly elections for Indian National Congress Party in Suryapet Constituency.

Political career 
He is five times MLA from Thungathurthy Assembly Constituency. Later he has shifted his constituency from Thungathurthy (Assembly Constituency) to Suryapet (Assembly Constituency) in 2009. R. Damodar Reddy has been a consistent and strong voice in favor of Telangana statehood issue among the Congress leaders. He also served as Minister for Communications and Information Technology in the first cabinet of YS Rajasekhara Reddy.

References 

Indian National Congress politicians from Telangana
Telangana politicians
1952 births
People from Suryapet
Living people
Andhra Pradesh MLAs 2009–2014